Mende Brown (1920-2002) was an American writer, producer and director of radio, films and TV who lived and worked in Australia from 1970 to 1991.

His directing on radio included The Affairs of Peter Salem.

Family
Mende Brown was the brother of radio producer Himan Brown.

Select Credits
Strange Holiday (1970)
Little Jungle Boy (1970)
And Millions Will Die (1973)
Evil Touch (1973) (TV series)
On the Run (1982)

References

External links

American film directors
1920 births
2002 deaths